"Automaton" is a song by English funk band Jamiroquai. It was released as the lead single from their eighth studio album, Automaton (2017), on 27 January 2017. The song peaked at number 36 in France, number 61 in Japan, number 65 in Scotland, and number 31 on the U.S. Billboard Dance/Electronic Songs chart.

Composition
"Automaton" was written and produced by Jamiroquai members Matt Johnson and Jay Kay. Kay also provided vocals for the track. It is a disco, funk, and dance-pop song that has drawn several comparisons to the works of French electronic music duo Daft Punk. The song features an instrumental that contains synthesisers which have been compared with those from the soundtrack for the 1982 film Tron, as well as vocals that feature a vocoder effect. Near the end of the song, Kay engages in a rap. Both Billboard and PopMatters compared his rap verse to the work of Afrika Bambaataa. "Automaton" was described as a "sci-fi wonderland of vocoders and electronic whirs" by Ben Kaye of Consequence of Sound. Daniel Kreps of Rolling Stone described the song's progression as "propulsive verses [that] suddenly make way for the track's booming chorus before abruptly turning into a Daft Punk-like bridge where a synthetic voice chants 'I'm automaton.'"

Release
"Automaton" premiered on 26 January 2017 during The Jo Whiley Show on BBC Radio 2 and was released as a single the following day, acting as their first single in seven years. A music video was released alongside the song on the same day. It was announced on 22 March that the song would receive a release as a limited edition 10-inch vinyl in the UK for Record Store Day 2017, which takes place on 22 April. "Nights Out in the Jungle" acts as the vinyl's B-side.

Music video
A music video for "Automaton" was released to coincide with its release. The video was directed by Charlie Lightening, with some creative direction done by Jay Kay. A nuclear explosion is shown at the very start of the video; Daniel Kreps thought it was fitting, as the Doomsday Clock had moved closer to midnight on the day of its release. Kay's usage of headgear in videos continues, as he dons a light-up helmet in this one. Throughout the video, Kay explores different locations, including, Orford Ness (many times throughout the video), a post-apocalyptic London, and the tunnels of its Underground railroad network. Science fiction imagery is shown throughout, as well.

Track listing
Download and streaming release

Vinyl release

Charts

Release history

References

2017 singles
2017 songs
Jamiroquai songs
Songs written by Jason Kay
Songs written by Matt Johnson (keyboardist)
Virgin EMI Records singles
Disco songs
Dance-pop songs